William Feimster Tucker (May 9, 1827 – September 14, 1881) was a brigadier general in the Confederate States Army during the American Civil War.

Early life
Tucker was born in Iredell County, North Carolina. He attended Emory and Henry College in Abingdon, Virginia, and graduated in 1848. That same year he moved to Houston, Mississippi. In 1855, he was elected probate judge of Chickasaw County. Tucker then studied law and was admitted to the bar and began practicing.

Civil War
Tucker entered the Confederate Army as a captain of Company K, 11th Mississippi Infantry Regiment. He was part of Barnard Bee's brigade at the First Battle of Manassas. Soon afterwards Tucker's company was sent to the West and merged with the 41st Mississippi Infantry Regiment. Tucker was commissioned colonel of the regiment in May 1862. He led the regiment at the Battles of Perryville, Murfreesboro, Chickamauga, and Chattanooga before being promoted to brigadier general to rank from March 1, 1864. Tucker's field duty ended that summer after suffering a severe wound at the Battle of Resaca during the Atlanta Campaign. In the last weeks of the war he commanded the District of Southern Mississippi and East Louisiana.

Post-War and murder
After the war, Tucker returned to Chickasaw County and again practiced law. He was elected to the state house of representatives in 1876 and 1878, representing Chickasaw County. He was assassinated on September 14, 1881, in Okolona, Mississippi. It was alleged that a man whom Tucker had a case pending against had hired two men to assassinate him. His daughter, Rosa Lee Tucker, served as State Librarian of Mississippi. His son, also named William Feimster Tucker, served in the Mississippi legislature.

See also

List of American Civil War generals (Confederate)

References

Citations

Bibliography
 Eicher, John H., and David J. Eicher, Civil War High Commands. Stanford: Stanford University Press, 2001. .
 Sifakis, Stewart. Who Was Who in the Civil War. New York: Facts On File, 1988. .
 Warner, Ezra J. Generals in Gray: Lives of the Confederate Commanders. Baton Rouge: Louisiana State University Press, 1959. .

1827 births
1881 deaths
1881 murders in the United States
Confederate States Army brigadier generals
People of North Carolina in the American Civil War
People of Mississippi in the American Civil War
Assassinated military personnel
People murdered in Mississippi
Male murder victims
People from Iredell County, North Carolina
People from Houston, Mississippi